A Twenty20 International (T20I) is a form of cricket, played between two of the international members of the International Cricket Council (ICC), in which each team faces a maximum of twenty overs. The matches have top-class status and are the highest T20 standard. The game is played under the rules of Twenty20 cricket. The first Twenty20 International match between two men's sides was played on 17 February 2005, involving Pakistan and New Zealand. Wisden Cricketers' Almanack reported that "neither side took the game especially seriously", and it was noted by ESPNcricinfo that but for a large score for Ricky Ponting, "the concept would have shuddered". However, Ponting himself said "if it does become an international game then I'm sure the novelty won't be there all the time".
This is a list of Pakistan Cricket team's Twenty20 International records. It is based on the List of Twenty20 International records, but concentrates solely on records dealing with the Pakistani cricket team. Pakistan played the first T20I in 2006.

Key
The top five records are listed for each category, except for the team wins, losses, draws and ties, all round records and the partnership records. Tied records for fifth place are also included. Explanations of the general symbols and cricketing terms used in the list are given below. Specific details are provided in each category where appropriate. All records include matches played for Pakistan only, and are correct .

Team records

Overall Record

Team wins, losses, draws and ties 
, Pakistan has played 210 T20I matches resulting in 127 victories, 75 defeats, 3 ties and 5 no results for an overall winning percentage of 60.47

First bilateral T20I series wins

First T20I match wins

Team scoring records

Most runs in an innings
The highest innings total scored in T20Is has been scored twice. The first occasion came in the match between Afghanistan and Ireland when Afghanistan scored 278/3 in the 2nd T20I of the Ireland series in India in February 2019. The Czech Republic national cricket team against Turkey during the 2019 Continental Cup scored 278/4 to equal the record. The highest score for Pakistan is 205/3 scored against West Indies during the West Indies tour of Pakistan in April 2018.

Fewest runs in an innings
The lowest innings total scored was by Turkey against Czech Republic when they were dismissed for 21 during the 2019 Continental Cup. The lowest score in T20I history for Pakistan is 74 scored against Australia in the 2012 T20I series against Australia in the UAE.

Most runs conceded in an innings
The third T20I of the England tour of Pakistan 2022 saw Pakistan concede their highest innings total of 221/3.

Fewest runs conceded in an innings
The lowest score conceded by Pakistan for a full inning is 60 when they dismissed West Indies during the first T20 of the West Indies tour of Pakistan in April 2018.

Most runs aggregate in a match
The highest match aggregate scored in T20Is came in the match between India and West Indies in the first T20I of the August 2016 series at Central Broward Regional Park, Lauderhill when India scored 244/4 in response to West Indies score of 245/6 to loose the match by 1 run. The second T20I of the 2013-14 T20I Series against Sri Lanka in the UAE saw a total of 398 runs being scored, the most involving Pakistan.

Fewest runs aggregate in a match
The lowest match aggregate in T20Is is 57 when Turkey were dismissed for 28 by Luxembourg in the second T20I of the 2019 Continental Cup in Romania in August 2019. The lowest match aggregate in T20I history for Pakistan is 168 scored during the 2016 Asia Cup against India at Mirpur, Bangladesh.

Result records
A T20I match is won when one side has scored more runs than the runs scored by the opposing side during their innings. If both sides have completed both their allocated innings and the side that fielded last has the higher aggregate of runs, it is known as a win by runs. This indicates the number of runs that they had scored more than the opposing side. If the side batting last wins the match, it is known as a win by wickets, indicating the number of wickets that were still to fall.

Greatest win margins (by runs)
The greatest winning margin by runs in T20Is was Czech Republic's victory over Turkey by 257 runs in the sixth match of the 2019 Continental Cup. The largest victory recorded by Pakistan was during the 2022 Asia Cup against Hong Kong by 155 runs.

Greatest win margins (by balls remaining)
The greatest winning margin by balls remaining in T20Is was Austria's victory over Turkey by 104 balls remaining in the ninth match of the 2019 Continental Cup. The largest victory recorded by Pakistan is during the 2009 ICC World Twenty20 against New Zealand when they won by 6 wickets with 41 balls remaining.

Greatest win margins (by wickets)
Pakistan have won a T20I match by 10 wickets twice, once against India and once against England.

Highest successful run chases
Australia holds the record for the highest successful run chase which they achieved when they scored 245/5 in response to New Zealand's 243/6. The largest target chased by Pakistan was against Australia in the final of the 2018 Zimbabwe Tri-Nation Series

Narrowest win margins (by runs)
The narrowest run margin victory is by 1 run which has been achieved in 15 T20I's. Pakistan has not won a game by such margin. The smallest has been by 2 runs.

Narrowest win margins (by balls remaining)
The narrowest winning margin by balls remaining in T20Is is by winning of the last ball which has been achieved 27 times. Pakistan has achieve victory of the last ball on two occasions.

Narrowest win margins (by wickets)
The narrowest margin of victory by wickets is 1 wicket which has settled four such T20Is. Pakistan has won once by this margin.

Greatest loss margins (by runs)
Pakistan's biggest defeat by runs was against New Zealand in the 2016 T20I series at Westpac Stadium, Wellington, New Zealand.

Greatest loss margins (by balls remaining)
The largest defeat suffered by Pakistan was against Australia in Zimbabwe during the 2018 Zimbabwe Tri-Nation Series when they lost by 9 wickets with 55 balls remaining.

Greatest loss margins (by wickets)
Pakistan have lost a T20I match by a margin of 10 wickets on three occasions.

Narrowest loss margins (by runs)
The narrowest loss of Pakistan in terms of runs is by 1 run suffered twice.

Narrowest loss margins (by balls remaining)
The narrowest defeat in terms of balls remaining for Pakistan has been loss with no balls remaining once.

Narrowest loss margins (by wickets)
Pakistan has suffered defeat by 3 wickets once.

Tied matches 
A tie can occur when the scores of both teams are equal at the conclusion of play, provided that the side batting last has completed their innings. 
There have been 19 ties in T20Is history with Pakistan involved in two such game.

Individual records

Batting records

Most career runs
A run is the basic means of scoring in cricket.
Martin Guptill (New Zealand) has scored the most runs in T20Is with Aggregate of 3299 runs. Followed by India's Virat Kohli and Rohit Sharma respectively with 3227 and 3197 runs. Babar Azam is the leading Pakistani batsman on this list.

Most runs in each batting position

Highest career average
A batsman's batting average is the total number of runs they have scored divided by the number of times they have been dismissed.

Highest Average in each batting position

Highest individual score
The third T20I of the 2018 Zimbabwe Tri-Nation Series saw Aaron Finch score the highest Individual score. Babar Azam scored the highest individual score for Pakistan during the 3rd T20I game against South Africa at SuperSport Park.

Highest individual score – progression of record

Highest score against each opponent

Most half-centuries
A half-century is a score of between 50 and 99 runs. Statistically, once a batsman's score reaches 100, it is no longer considered a half-century but a century.

Virat Kohli of India has scored the most half-centuries in T20Is with 34. He is followed by India's Rohit Sharma with 32 and Pakistan's Babar Azam with 29 half-centuries. Babar Azam also has the most fifties among Pakistani batsmen.

Most centuries
A century is a score of 100 or more runs by a batsman in a single innings.

Ahmed Shahzad, Muhammad Rizwan, and Babar Azam each have scored 1 century for Pakistan.

Most Sixes

Most Fours

Highest strike rates
Ravija Sandaruwan of Kuwait holds the record for highest strike rate, with minimum 250 balls faced qualification, with 165.80. Shahid Afridi is the Pakistani with the highest strike rate.

Highest strike rates in an inning
Dwayne Smith of West Indies strike rate of 414.28 during his 29 off 7 balls against Bangladesh during 2007 ICC World Twenty20 is the world record for highest strike rate in an innings. Afridi with his innings of 25 off 7 balls against South Africa in October 2010 during the 2010 T20I series holds the top position for a Pakistan player in this list.

Most runs in a calendar year
Mohammad Rizwan has so far scored 1239 runs in 2021, the most for a batsman in a year.

Most runs in a series
The 2014 ICC World Twenty20 in Bangladesh saw Virat Kohli set the record for the most runs scored in a single series scoring 319 runs. He is followed by Tillakaratne Dilshan with 317 runs scored in the 2009 ICC World Twenty20. Fakhar Zaman has scored the most runs in a series for a Pakistan batsmen, when he scored 278 runs in the 2018 Zimbabwe Tri-Nation Series.

Most ducks
A duck refers to a batsman being dismissed without scoring a run. 
Tillakaratne Dilshan of Sri Lanka, Pakistan's Umar Akmal and Ireland's Kevin O'Brien has scored the equal highest number of ducks in T20Is with 10 such knocks.

Bowling records

Most career wickets 
A bowler takes the wicket of a batsman when the form of dismissal is bowled, caught, leg before wicket, stumped or hit wicket. If the batsman is dismissed by run out, obstructing the field, handling the ball, hitting the ball twice or timed out the bowler does not receive credit.

Sakib Al Hasan, of Bangladesh, is the highest wicket-taker in T20Is. Shahid Afridi is the highest ranked Pakistani bowler on the all-time.

Best figures in an innings 
Bowling figures refers to the number of the wickets a bowler has taken and the number of runs conceded.
India's Deepak Chahar holds the world record for best figures in an innings when he took 6/7 against Bangladesh in November 2019 at Nagpur. Umar Gul holds the Pakistani record for best bowling figures.

Best figures in an innings – progression of record

Best Bowling Figure against each opponent

Best career average 
A bowler's bowling average is the total number of runs they have conceded divided by the number of wickets they have taken.

Best career economy rate 
A bowler's economy rate is the total number of runs they have conceded divided by the number of overs they have bowled.
New Zealand's Daniel Vettori, holds the T20I record for the best career economy rate with 5.70. Imad Wasim is the highest Pakistani on the list.

Best career strike rate 
A bowler's strike rate is the total number of balls they have bowled divided by the number of wickets they have taken.
The top bowler with the best T20I career strike rate is Rashid Khan of Afghanistan with 12.3 balls per wicket strike rate. Umar Gul is the Pakistani bowler with the lowest strike rate.

Most four-wickets (& over) hauls in an innings 
Pakistan's Umar Gul has taken the most four-wickets (or over) among all the bowlers.

Best economy rates in an inning 
The best economy rate in an inning, when a minimum of 12 balls are delivered by the bowler, is Sri Lankan player Nuwan Kulasekara economy of 0.00 during his spell of 0 runs for 1 wicket in 2 overs against the Netherlands at Zohur Ahmed Chowdhury Stadium in the 2014 ICC World Twenty20. Mohammad Amir holds the two positions for Pakistan.

Best strike rates in an inning 
The best strike rate in an inning, when a minimum of 4 wickets are taken by the player, is by Steve Tikolo of Kenya during his spell of 4/2 in 1.2 overs against Scotland during the 2013 ICC World Twenty20 Qualifier at ICC Academy, Dubai, UAE. Umar Gul has the lowest strike rate in an inning among Pakistani bowlers.

Worst figures in an innings 
The worst figures in a T20I came in the Sri Lanka's tour of Australia when Kasun Rajitha of Sri Lanka had figures of 0/75 off his four overs at Adelaide Oval, Adelaide. The worst figures by a Pakistani is 0/63 that came off the bowling of Usman Shinwari in the 2019 tour of South Africa at New Wanderers Stadium, Johannesburg, South Africa.

Most runs conceded in a match 
Kasun Rajitha also holds the dubious distinction of most runs conceded in a T20I during the aforementioned match. Usman Shnwari in the above-mentioned spell conceded the most runs for Pakistani bowler.

Most wickets in a calendar year 
Pakistan's Shadab Khan took 28 wickets in 2018, the most for a Pakistani bowler.

Most wickets in a series 
2019 ICC World Twenty20 Qualifier at UAE saw records set for the most wickets taken by a bowler in a T20I series when Oman's pacer Bilal Khan took 18 wickets during the series. Umar Gul took 13 wickets in 2007 ICC World Twenty20 and in 2009 ICC World Twenty20, the most for a Pakistani bowler in a series.

Hat-trick 
In cricket, a hat-trick occurs when a bowler takes three wickets with consecutive deliveries. The deliveries may be interrupted by an over bowled by another bowler from the other end of the pitch or the other team's innings, but must be three consecutive deliveries by the individual bowler in the same match. Only wickets attributed to the bowler count towards a hat-trick; run outs do not count.
In T20Is history there have been just 13 hat-tricks, the first achieved by Brett Lee for Australia against Bangladesh in 2007 ICC World Twenty20.

Wicket-keeping records
The wicket-keeper is a specialist fielder who stands behind the stumps being guarded by the batsman on strike and is the only member of the fielding side allowed to wear gloves and leg pads.

Most career dismissals 
A wicket-keeper can be credited with the dismissal of a batsman in two ways, caught or stumped. A fair catch is taken when the ball is caught fully within the field of play without it bouncing after the ball has touched the striker's bat or glove holding the bat, Laws 5.6.2.2 and 5.6.2.3 state that the hand or the glove holding the bat shall be regarded as the ball striking or touching the bat while a stumping occurs when the wicket-keeper puts down the wicket while the batsman is out of his ground and not attempting a run.
Kamran Akmal is the highest ranked Pakistani wicket keeper in the all-time list of taking most dismissals in T20Is as a designated wicket-keeper, which is headed by India's MS Dhoni and West Indian Denesh Ramdin.

Most career catches 
Sarfaraz Ahmed has taken the most catches in T20Is as a designated wicket-keeper with Dhoni and Ramdin leading the all-time list.

Most career stumpings 
Dhoni and Kamran Akmal of Pakistan head this all-time list of stumpings among wicket-keepers.

Most dismissals in an innings 
Four wicket-keepers on four occasions have taken five dismissals in a single innings in a T20I.

The feat of taking 4 dismissals in an innings has been achieved by 19 wicket-keepers on 26 occasions with Kamran Akmal being the only Pakistani wicket-keeper.

Most dismissals in a series 
Netherlands wicket-keeper Scott Edwards holds the T20Is record for the most dismissals taken by a wicket-keeper in a series. He made 13 dismissals during the 2019 ICC World Twenty20 Qualifier. Pakistani record is held by Kamran Akmal when he made 9 dismissals during the 2010 ICC World Twenty20.

Fielding records

Most career catches 
Caught is one of the nine methods a batsman can be dismissed in cricket. The majority of catches are caught in the slips, located behind the batsman, next to the wicket-keeper, on the off side of the field. Most slip fielders are top order batsmen.

South Africa's David Miller holds the record for the most catches in T20Is by a non-wicket-keeper with 57, followed by Shoaib Malik of Pakistan on 50 and New Zealand's Martin Guptill with 47.

Most catches in an innings 
The feat of taking 4 catches in an innings has been achieved by 14 fielders on 14 occasions. No Pakistani fielder has achieved this feat. The most is three catches on nine occasions.

Most catches in a series 
The 2019 ICC Men's T20 World Cup Qualifier, which saw Netherlands retain their title, saw the record set for the most catches taken by a non-wicket-keeper in a T20I series. Jersey's Ben Stevens and Namibia's JJ Smit took 10 catches in the series. Umar Akmal took 7 catches in the 2010 ICC World Twenty20 are the leading Pakistani fielder on this list.

Other records

Most career matches 
Pakistan's Shoaib Malik holds the record for the most T20I matches played with 123, followed by team-mate Mohammad Hafeez with 119 games and then Rohit Sharma of India with 119.

Most consecutive career matches 
Scotland's Richie Berrington holds the record for the most consecutive T20I matches played with 72. Saeed Ajmal holds the Pakistani record.

Most matches as captain 
MS Dhoni, who led the Indian cricket team from 2007 to 2016, holds the record for the most matches played as captain in T20Is with 72. Babar Azam has led Pakistan in 52 matches, the most for any player from his country.

Most man of the match awards

Most man of the series awards

Youngest players on Debut 
The youngest player to play in a T20I match is Marian Gherasim at the age of 14 years and 16 days. Making his debut for Romania against the Bulgaria on 16 October 2020 in the first T20I of the 2020 Balkan Cup thus becoming the youngest to play in a men's T20I match.

Oldest Players on Debut 
The Turkish batsmen Osman Göker is the oldest player to make their debut a T20I match. Playing in the 2019 Continental Cup against Romania at Moara Vlasiei Cricket Ground, Moara Vlăsiei he was aged 59 years and 181 days.

Oldest Players 
The Turkish batsmen Osman Göker is the oldest player to appear in a T20I match during the same above mentioned match.

Partnership records
In cricket, two batsmen are always present at the crease batting together in a partnership. This partnership will continue until one of them is dismissed, retires or the innings comes to a close.

Highest partnerships by wicket
A wicket partnership describes the number of runs scored before each wicket falls. The first wicket partnership is between the opening batsmen and continues until the first wicket falls. The second wicket partnership then commences between the not out batsman and the number three batsman. This partnership continues until the second wicket falls. The third wicket partnership then commences between the not out batsman and the new batsman. This continues down to the tenth wicket partnership. When the tenth wicket has fallen, there is no batsman left to partner so the innings is closed.

Highest partnerships by runs
The highest T20I partnership by runs for any wicket is held by the Afghan pairing of Hazratullah Zazai and Usman Ghani who put together an opening wicket partnership of 236 runs during the Ireland v Afghanistan series in India in 2019

Highest overall partnership runs by a pair

Umpiring records

Most matches umpired
An umpire in cricket is a person who officiates the match according to the Laws of Cricket. Two umpires adjudicate the match on the field, whilst a third umpire has access to video replays, and a fourth umpire looks after the match balls and other duties. The records below are only for on-field umpires.

Aleem Dar of Pakistan holds the record for the most T20I matches umpired with 60.

See also

List of Twenty20 International records
List of Test cricket records
List of Cricket World Cup records

Notes

References

Twenty20 International records
Pakistan
Pakistan in international cricket